"Don't Come Out the House" is a song by American record producer Metro Boomin featuring rapper 21 Savage. It was released on November 2, 2018 from Metro's debut studio album Not All Heroes Wear Capes. Produced by Metro Boomin and Tay Keith, the song is noted for 21 Savage's whispering vocals.

Composition
"Don't Come Out the House" is a horrorcore song that finds 21 Savage rapping in a whisper flow which has been compared to the song "Wait (The Whisper Song)" by the Ying Yang Twins. He whisper-raps over Tay Keith-produced bass and drums, while returning to his standard voice when the instrumental switches to piano keys produced by Metro Boomin. 21 Savage raps about the brutality of his past life, growing up around poverty and violence, and giving a warning to his enemies.

Critical reception
The song received generally positive reviews from critics. It has been regarded as arguably the best song from Not All Heroes Wear Capes. Sheldon Pearce of Pitchfork wrote, "Through half-whispered verses and spook-filled production, the duo again bring the chills, reanimating the corpses from 21's past ("All these bodies, I can't sleep at night, nigga") and threatening those who oppose him with a similar fate." Marcus Blackwell of HipHopDX described the song as the most menacing record on the album, writing that 21 Savage "drops all kinds of murderous bars over a hard-hitting Metro and Tay Keith concoction". Thomas Hobbs of Highsnobiety called it "one of the best rap songs of the year".

Charts

Certifications

References

2018 songs
Metro Boomin songs
21 Savage songs
Song recordings produced by Metro Boomin
Song recordings produced by Tay Keith
Songs written by Metro Boomin
Songs written by 21 Savage
Songs written by Tay Keith